Denton and Caldecote – in Huntingdonshire (now part of Cambridgeshire), England – is a civil parish near Glatton south west of Yaxley. The parish was formed on 1 April 1935 from "Caldecote" and "Denton".

Demography

Population
In the period 1801 to 1901 the population of Denton and Caldecote was recorded every ten years by the UK census.  During this time the population was in the range of 83 (the lowest was in 1891) and 157 (the highest was in 1861).

From 1901, a census was taken every ten years with the exception of 1941 (due to the Second World War).

All population census figures from report Historic Census figures Cambridgeshire to 2011 by Cambridgeshire Insight.

References

Huntingdonshire
Civil parishes in Cambridgeshire